Sanjit Narwekar (born 8 May 1952) is an Indian documentary filmmaker scriptwriter and author. A 1967 alumni of Bombay Scottish High School, Mumbai, he completed his Bachelor’s in Statistics (1974) and his Master’s in Economics (1976) from the University of Mumbai.

Early career
He began writing in 1969 while he was still in college and has more than 2500 articles to his credit in the last 50 years. During his post graduation he worked at the National Institute of Bank Management but opted to work in journalism soon after he had completed his Masters. He worked in a wide variety of newspaper organizations and has been News Editor of Screen (1980-1991), Editor of TV & Video World (1994–95) and Executive Editor of Documentary Today (2007-2012).

Career
Narwekar has authored/edited 20 books on film history and published more than 100 books for various organizations. He has also hosted interviews/magazine programs for All India Radio and Doordarshan. He has participated in several national and international seminars and conducted workshops on various aspects of Indian cinema, both in India and abroad.  He has also served on several selection committees and juries and has been a member of the Film Advisory Board of the Government of India (1992–93).

He worked briefly as scriptwriter before turning to documentary films. He is based in Mumbai, India and heads his cinema research company Cinemaink.

Awards
In 1996 he was awarded the Swarna Kamal (National Award) for the Best Book on Cinema for Marathi Cinema in Retrospect. The Delhi-based newspaper The Pioneer nominated it among the top five books on Indian cinema in post-independent India (1947–1997).

In 2017 he was made Sanmanniya Sabhasad (Distinguished Fellow) of the Mumbai Marathi Patrakar Sangh.

In 2020 he was conferred the Bimal Roy Memorial Award "for documenting Indian Cinema's History with knowledge and scholarship".

In 2022 he was Chairman, National Jury, Mumbai International Film Festival for Documentary, Short and Animation Films 2022. Interaction with National Jury

In 2022 he was conferred the Dr V Shantaram Lifetime Achievement Award at the Mumbai International Film Festival for Documentary, Short and Animation Films 2022.Award presentation

Films: Documentaries
 Nations in Turmoil (Writer-Director) (2011)
  (Writer-Producer-Director) (2010)
 Dreaming Movies (Writer-Director) (2007)
 Protecting Creativity (Writer-Director) (2005)
 Remembering Devendra Goel (Creative Consultant) (2005)
 Lavni Rupdarshan (Director) (2004)
 Life On The Edge (Writer-Director) (2002)
 Yes! I Am A Communist (Writer/Co-director: Vinay Newalkar) (2002)
 India Unveiled (Writer-Director) (1998)
 Lavni (Executive Producer-Writer) (1998)

Films: Short Fiction
 Mahilaone Thama Tha Akash (miniseries)(Executive Producer) (2002)
 Yeh Kal Kab Aayega (Writer-Director) (2001)

Film Scripts

 Durghatna (Hindi) (1994/unproduced)
 Ghar Sansar (Marathi) (1993)
 Khulyancha Bazaar (Marathi) (1992)
 Premankur (Marathi) (1992)
 Anapekshit (Marathi) (1990)
 Saboot (Hindi telefilm) (1989)
 Samarpan (Hindi telefilm) (1988)

Books: Biography

 Ambalal Patel: A Visionary (2014)
 K.A.Abbas: The Celluloid Revolutionary (2009/unpublished)
 Bimal Roy: The Silent Thunder (2008/unpublished)
 Dilip Kumar: The Last Emperor (2003) 
 V.Shantaram: The Legacy of the Royal Lotus (2003) 
 Mother Shamala: A Gift Of Motherhood (1998)
 J.G.Bodhe: The Uncommon Common Man (1986)

Books: Film History
 Nitrate Dreams: The Silent Film in India (work in progress)
 Documenting India: The Legacy of the Films Division (work in progress)
 Eena Meena Deeka: The Story of Hindi Film Comedy (2005) 
 The Watchdogs of Democracy: The Story of Investigative Journalism (2005)
 Flashback: A Panorama of Indian Documentaries 1981-2001 (2001)
 Crafting Movies: Exploring Hindi Mainstream Cinema (2000)
 Directory of Indian Documentary (1998)
 The Arrival of Cinema in India (1996)
 Marathi Cinema: In Retrospect (1995)
 A Directory of Indian Filmmakers & Films (1994) 
 Films Division & The Indian Documentary (1992)
 Genres of Indian Cinema (Co-Editor: B. K. Karanjia) (1988)

References

Living people
1952 births
Indian documentary filmmakers
University of Mumbai alumni
Indian male screenwriters
Indian film historians